Clariaidae is a family of rotifers belonging to the order Ploima.

One genus with one species:
 Claria Kutikova, Markevich & Spiridonov, 1990
 Claria segmentata Kutikova, Markevich & Spiridonov, 1990

References

Ploima
Rotifer families